Thomas A. Wadden (born September 3, 1952) is a clinical psychologist and educator who is known for his research on the treatment of obesity by methods that include lifestyle modification, pharmacotherapy, and bariatric surgery. He is the Albert J. Stunkard Professor of Psychology in Psychiatry at the Perelman School of Medicine at the University of Pennsylvania and former director of the university's Center for Weight and Eating Disorders. He also is visiting professor of psychology at Haverford College.

Wadden has published more than 550 peer-reviewed scientific papers and abstracts, as well as 7 edited books. Over the course of his career, he has served on expert panels for the National Institutes of Health, the Federal Trade Commission, the Department of Veterans Affairs, and the U.S. House of Representatives. His research has been recognized by awards from several organizations including the Association for the Advancement of Behavior Therapy and The Obesity Society.

Wadden is a fellow of the Academy of Behavioral Medicine Research, the College of Physicians of Philadelphia, the Obesity Society, and Society of Behavioral Medicine. In 2015, the Obesity Society created the Thomas A. Wadden Award for Distinguished Mentorship, recognizing his education of scientists and practitioners in the field of obesity.

Early life and education 
Wadden is a native of Washington, D.C. and a graduate of the Landon School in Bethesda, Maryland. He received his bachelor's degree in psychology in 1975 from Brown University and his doctorate in clinical psychology in 1981 from the University of North Carolina at Chapel Hill.

Career 
In 1982, Wadden was appointed to the faculty in the Department of Psychiatry at the University of Pennsylvania, where he began his clinical and research career on the treatment of obesity and its associated eating disorders. After a decade at Penn, he joined Syracuse University as Professor of Psychology, Director of Clinical Training, and Director of the Center for Health and Behavior. He returned to the University of Pennsylvania in 1994 as Professor of Psychology in the Department of Psychiatry. He also was appointed at this time as Director of Penn's Center for Weight and Eating Disorders, which he led for more than two decades (1994-2017). During this time he also held numerous positions in the Obesity Society, serving as president in 2005–2006.

In 2011 Wadden was named the inaugural recipient of the Albert J. Stunkard Chair in Psychiatry at the University of Pennsylvania. In this position, he currently is continuing his program of research on obesity which has been supported by the NIH for more than 30 years. Wadden joined the faculty of Haverford College as visiting professor in 2013 and has also taught at Bryn Mawr College.

Wadden is a fellow of the Academy of Behavioral Medicine Research, the College of Physicians of Philadelphia, the Obesity Society, and the Society of Behavioral Medicine. He has served on the editorial boards of Behavior Therapy, Health Psychology, International Journal of Eating Disorders, International Journal of Obesity, and Journal of Consulting and Clinical Psychology. He was an associate editor of Annals of Behavioral Medicine from 1990 to 1993 and of the journal Obesity from 2007 to 2012.

Over the course of his career, Wadden has served on expert panels for the National Institutes of Health, the Federal Trade Commission, the Department of Veterans Affairs, and the U.S. House of Representatives. His research has been recognized by awards from the Association for the Advancement of Behavior Therapy, the Obesity Society, the Association for Psychologists in Academic Health Centers, and the Department of Psychology at the University of North Carolina. He also has been honored by the Obesity Society and the Perelman School of Medicine for distinguished mentoring of research fellows and junior faculty.

Research and work 
Wadden has published more than 500 peer-reviewed scientific papers and abstracts, as well as 7 edited books, the most recent of which is Handbook of Obesity Treatment, 2nd edition (with George A. Bray). Wadden's early contributions to the management of obesity included the first controlled, long-term trial of high protein, very low calorie diets (<800 kcal/d) and the documentation of the marked weight regain with this approach. With colleagues, he provided a model for commercial weight loss programs to evaluate and publish their short- and long-term weight losses, thus, allowing physicians and their patients to make informed choices among programs. This work resulted in Congressional testimony and in a collaboration with the Federal Trade Commission, other researchers, and members of the weight loss industry to improve information provided to prospective dieters.

In other areas, Wadden has shown the benefits of combining weight loss medications with intensive lifestyle modification, which produces weight losses substantially greater than either intervention used alone. With colleagues from the Look AHEAD Research Group, he demonstrated that patients with obesity and type 2 diabetes who lost approximately 8% of initial weight with an intensive lifestyle intervention experienced long-term improvements in cardiovascular risk factors, quality of life, and medical care costs. Wadden also has worked to increase the provision of behavioral treatment for obesity in primary care settings, as recommended by the U.S. Preventive Services Task Force and the Centers for Medicare and Medicaid Services. His evidence-based treatment manual on this topic is available, on the web, to practitioners and researchers. With Gary Foster, Wadden also developed the Weight and Lifestyle Inventory (WALI), which is widely used to assess the behavioral and psychosocial status of candidates for bariatric surgery.

Awards and honors 
1986 - New Researcher Award, Association for the Advancement of Behavior Therapy (now Association for Behavioral and Cognitive Therapies)
1992 - Fellow, Academy of Behavioral Medicine Research
1995 - Fellow, Society of Behavioral Medicine
2000 - Fellow, College of Physicians of Philadelphia
2007 - Distinguished Alumni Award, University of North Carolina, Department of Psychology
2007 - Howard-Carter Award for Excellence in Bariatric Medicine, Albany Medical Center
2007 - Arthur Asbury Outstanding Faculty Mentor Award, University of Pennsylvania School of Medicine
2009 - George A. Bray Founders Award, The Obesity Society
2012 - TOPS Research Achievement Award, The Obesity Society
2012 - Bud Orgel Award for Distinguished Achievement in Research, Association for Psychologists in Academic Health Centers, American Psychological Association	
2015 - Thomas A. Wadden Award for Distinguished Mentorship (inaugural recipient), The Obesity Society	
2019 - Doctor of Humane Letters, Honoris Causa, Philadelphia College of Osteopathic Medicine

Selected publications

Books 
Treatment of the Seriously Obese Patient (1992) (with T.B. Van Itallie)	
Obesity: Theory and Therapy (2nd edition) (1993) (with A.J. Stunkard)
The LEARN Program for Weight Control: Special Medication Edition (1998) (with K.D. Brownell)
Handbook of Obesity Treatment (2002) (with A.J. Stunkard)
Obesity: A Guide for Mental Health Professionals (2005) (with A.J. Stunkard & R.I. Berkowitz)
Obesity and Associated Eating Disorders: A guide for Mental Health Professionals (2011) (with G.T. Wilson, A.J. Stunkard, & R.I. Berkowitz)
Handbook of Obesity Treatment (2nd edition) (2018) (with G.A. Bray)

Articles 
Wadden TA, Stunkard AJ. The psychological and social consequences of obesity. Ann Int Med 1985;103:1062 1067.
Wadden TA, Sternberg JA, Letizia KA, Stunkard AJ, Foster GD. Very low calorie diet, behavior therapy, and their combination in the treatment of obesity: A five-year perspective. Int J Obesity 1989;13:39-46.
Wadden TA, Bailey TS, Billings LK, et al. Effect of Subcutaneous Semaglutide vs Placebo as an Adjunct to Intensive Behavioral Therapy on Body Weight in Adults With Overweight or Obesity: The STEP 3 Randomized Clinical Trial. JAMA 2021;325(14):1403-1413
Wadden TA, Berkowitz RI, Womble LG, et al. Randomized trial of lifestyle modification and pharmacotherapy for obesity. N Engl J Med 2005;353:2111-20.
Wadden TA, West DS, Neiberg RH, et al. One-year weight losses in the Look Ahead study: factors associated with success. Obesity. 2009;17:713-22. 
Wadden TA, Volger S, Sarwer DB, et al. A two-year randomized trial of obesity treatment in primary care practice. N Engl J Med. 2011;365:1969-79.
Wadden TA, Webb VL, Moran CH, Bailer BA. Lifestyle modification for obesity: new developments in diet, physical activity, and behavior therapy. Circulation. 2012;125:1157-70.	
Look AHEAD Research Group, Wing RR, Bolin P, et al. Cardiovascular effects of intensive lifestyle intervention in type 2 diabetes. N Engl J Med. 2013;369:145-54. 	
Wadden TA, Butryn ML, Hong PS, Tsai AG. Behavioral treatment of obesity in patients encountered in primary care settings: A systematic review. JAMA. 2014;312:1779-91.	
Heymsfield SB, Wadden TA. Mechanisms, pathophysiology, and management of obesity. N Engl J Med. 2017;376:254-266.

References 

Brown University alumni
University of North Carolina at Chapel Hill alumni
University of Pennsylvania faculty
Living people
1952 births
21st-century American psychologists
20th-century American psychologists